The 2018 Newham London Borough Council election was held on 3 May 2018 to elect members of Newham London Borough Council in England. This was on the same day as other local elections.

Elections were held for the Mayor of Newham and for all 60 seats on the council. The Labour Party candidate Rokhsana Fiaz won the mayoral election. Labour candidates won all 60 seats on the council, as they did in 2014 and 2010.

Summary results
The Labour Party won 67% of the vote and all 60 seats for the third election in a row.

|}

Background
A total of 181 candidates stood in the election for the 60 seats being contested across 20 wards. Candidates included a full slate from the Labour party (as had been the case at every election since the borough council had been formed in 1964), whilst the Conservative party also ran a full slate for the second election in a row, and the Liberal Democrats ran 14 candidates. Other candidates running were 25 Christian Peoples Alliance,  11 Greens, 4 TUSC, 2 UKIP, 2 Democrats and Veterans, 1 Communist League and 2 Independents.

Ward results
An asterisk * indicates an incumbent Councillor seeking re-election.

Beckton

Boleyn

Canning Town North

Canning Town South

Custom House

East Ham Central

East Ham North

East Ham South

Forest Gate North

Forest Gate South

Green Street East

Green Street West

Little Ilford

Manor Park

Plaistow North

Plaistow South

Royal Docks

Stratford and New Town

Wall End

West Ham

By-elections between 2018 and 2022

Boleyn

The by-election was called following the resignation of Cllr Veronica Oakeshott.

East Ham

The by-election was called following the resignation of Cllr Julianne Marriott.

References

2018 London Borough council elections
2018